The 2022 Veikkausliiga is the 92nd season of top-tier football in Finland. HJK are the defending champions.

Teams

KTP (relegated after one year in the top flight) were relegated to Ykkönen after finishing at the bottom of the 2021 season. Their place was taken by Ykkönen champions VPS (promoted after a two-year absence).

Stadia and locations

Personnel and kits
Note: Flags indicate national team as has been defined under FIFA eligibility rules. Players and Managers may hold more than one non-FIFA nationality.

Regular season

League table

Results

Championship round

Relegation round

Europa Conference League play-offs

Quarter-finals

Semifinal

Final

First leg

Second leg

Relegation play-offs

Ykkönen Playoff Semifinals

Ykkönen Playoff Finals

Promotion/relegation play-off final

First Leg

Second Leg

Statistics

Top goalscorers

Awards

Annual awards

Team of the Year

Attendance

References

External links
 Official website
 Soccerway

Veikkausliiga seasons
Vei
Fin
Fin